Makovo (Cyrillic Маково) may refer to:
Makovo, Bulgaria, a village in northeastern Bulgaria
Makovo, North Macedonia, a village in southwestern North Macedonia
 Several rural localities in Russia:
 Makovo, Astrakhan Oblast, a village in Makovsky Selsoviet of Volodarsky District, Astrakhan Oblast
 Makovo, Kaluga Oblast, a village in Babyninsky District, Kaluga Oblast
 Makovo, Lipetsk Oblast, a village in Lomigorsky Selsoviet of Volovsky District, Lipetsk Oblast
 Makovo, Ryazan Oblast, a village in Streletsko-Vyselsky Rural Okrug of Mikhaylovsky District, Ryazan Oblast

See also
Makowo (disambiguation)